Bomb in the High Street is a 1963 British drama film directed by Peter Bezencenet and Terry Bishop. It stars Ronald Howard, Terry Palmer, and Suzanna Leigh.

Premise
A gang of villains carry out a bank robbery disguised as soldiers, creating a diversion using a fake bomb scare.

Cast  
 Ronald Howard as Captain Manning 
 Terry Palmer as Mike 
 Suzanna Leigh as Jackie 
 Jack Allen as Superintendent Haley 
 Peter Gilmore as Shorty 
 Russell Waters as Trent 
 Maurice Good as Feeney 
 Geoffrey Bayldon as Clay 
 Jack Lambert as Sergeant 
 Humphrey Lestocq as Reporter 
 A. J. Brown as Nightwatchman 
 Gerald Case as Ventry 
 Margaret Lacey as Woman at barrier 
 Leonard Sachs as Freeling 
 James Villiers as Stevens

References

External links
 

1961 films
British drama films
1961 drama films
British heist films
1960s English-language films
Films directed by Peter Bezencenet
Films directed by Terry Bishop
1960s British films